Thiago Heleno Henrique Ferreira (born 17 September 1988), known as Thiago Heleno, is a Brazilian footballer who plays for Athletico Paranaense as a central defender.

Club career
Born in Sete Lagoas, Minas Gerais, Thiago Heleno was a Cruzeiro youth graduate. He made his first team – and Série A – debut on 16 April 2006, coming on as a second-half substitute for injured Moisés in a 1–2 away loss against São Caetano.

Thiago Heleno scored his first professional goal on 3 June 2006, netting the first in a 2–0 win at Fortaleza. He finished the year with 17 appearances, losing his recently gained first-choice status in September.

Thiago Heleno appeared regularly for Raposa in the following years, being an undisputed starter in 2008. In August 2010 he was sold to ghost club Deportivo Maldonado, being subsequently loaned to fellow top league club Corinthians.

Thiago Heleno appeared in only five league matches (scoring in a 3–4 home loss against Atlético Goianiense), and was released at the end of the season. In January 2011 he moved to fierce rival Palmeiras.

On 26 March 2011, Thiago Heleno scored a double in a 3–0 Campeonato Paulista home win against Bragantino, which granted his team's qualification to the following round. He was released in December 2012, after the club's relegation.

In 2013 Thiago Heleno signed for Criciúma, but left the club in July after failing to make a single appearance for the club. On 15 January 2014 he joined Figueirense, winning promotion from Série B in his first season.

International career
Thiago Heleno represented Brazil at under-17 and under-20 levels, winning the 2005 South American Under 17 Football Championship with the former and the 2007 South American Youth Championship with the latter.

Career statistics

Honours

Club
Cruzeiro
Campeonato Mineiro: 2006, 2008, 2009

Palmeiras
Copa do Brasil: 2012

Athletico Paranaense
Campeonato Paranaense: 2016, 2020
Copa Sudamericana: 2018, 2021

International
Brazil U17
South American Under 17 Football Championship: 2005

Brazil U20
South American Youth Championship: 2007

Individual
 Copa Libertadores Team of the Tournament: 2022

References

External links

1988 births
Living people
Sportspeople from Minas Gerais
Brazilian footballers
Association football defenders
Campeonato Brasileiro Série A players
Campeonato Brasileiro Série B players
Cruzeiro Esporte Clube players
Sport Club Corinthians Paulista players
Sociedade Esportiva Palmeiras players
Criciúma Esporte Clube players
Figueirense FC players
Club Athletico Paranaense players
Deportivo Maldonado players
Brazil youth international footballers